Lukman Zaynaydiyevich Zhabrailov (born April 27, 1962) is a retired freestyle wrestler who competed for the Soviet Union and then for Moldova. He won a world title in 1994, a world cup in 1987, and two medals at European championships, in 1984 and 1994. At the 1996 Summer Olympics he competed against his younger brother Elmadi and lost 8–10. Lukman earlier prepared Elmadi for the 1992 Olympics, and both Lukman and Elmadi were earlier coached by their brother Ruslan.

References

External links
 

1962 births
Living people
People from Khasavyurt
Soviet male sport wrestlers
Wrestlers at the 1996 Summer Olympics
Olympic wrestlers of Moldova
Moldovan male sport wrestlers
European Wrestling Championships medalists
World Wrestling Championships medalists
Chechen martial artists
Spartak athletes